Blaine McCallister (born October 17, 1958) is an American professional golfer who has played on the PGA Tour, Nationwide Tour and Champions Tour.

McCallister was born in Fort Stockton, Texas. He attended the University of Houston and was a member of the golf team. His college roommates were future fellow professional golfer Fred Couples and future CBS Sports golf host Jim Nantz. McCallister turned pro in 1981.

McCallister joined the PGA Tour in 1982. He had a total of five wins on the PGA Tour, all of which came in the late 1980s and early 1990s. As he entered his forties, McCallister began to split his playing time between the PGA Tour and the Nationwide Tour. He established the tournament record of 265 at the Northeast Pennsylvania Classic, which is his sole win on the Nationwide Tour.

After turning 50 in October 2008, McCallister began playing on the Champions Tour.

McCallister is naturally left-handed but plays the game mix-handed; he writes left-handed, strikes the ball right-handed and putts left-handed. He lives in Jacksonville, Florida.

Professional wins (8)

PGA Tour wins (5)

PGA Tour playoff record (1–2)

PGA Tour of Australasia wins (1)

Nationwide Tour wins (1)

Other wins (1)
1986 Texas State Open

Results in major championships

CUT = missed the half-way cut
"T" = tied

Summary

Most consecutive cuts made – 8 (1990 U.S. Open – 1992 PGA)
Longest streak of top-10s – 0

See also
Fall 1981 PGA Tour Qualifying School graduates
1982 PGA Tour Qualifying School graduates
1985 PGA Tour Qualifying School graduates
1997 PGA Tour Qualifying School graduates
1999 PGA Tour Qualifying School graduates
2001 PGA Tour Qualifying School graduates
2003 Nationwide Tour graduates

References

External links

American male golfers
Houston Cougars men's golfers
PGA Tour golfers
PGA Tour Champions golfers
Korn Ferry Tour graduates
Golfers from Texas
Golfers from Jacksonville, Florida
People from Fort Stockton, Texas
People from Ponte Vedra Beach, Florida
1958 births
Living people